This article lists events that occurred during 2013 in Estonia.

Incumbents
 President: Toomas Hendrik Ilves 
 Prime Minister: Andrus Ansip

Events

Deaths
Elmar Tampõld

See also
2013 in Estonian television

 
2010s in Estonia
Estonia
Estonia
Years of the 21st century in Estonia